SS Malakand may refer to at least two ships, both of the Brocklebank Line, named after the Malakand area of the Indian subcontinent:

, a cargo liner launched in 1905 and sunk in 1917
, a cargo liner built in 1919 which exploded at Liverpool in 1941

Ship names